The Best of Both Worlds is the second greatest hits album by American rock band Van Halen, released on July 20, 2004, on Warner Bros. The compilation features material recorded with lead vocalists David Lee Roth and Sammy Hagar, but omitting Gary Cherone's three-year tenure with the band. Prior to The Best of Both Worlds release, Hagar reunited with Van Halen, and the band subsequently recorded three new tracks to include on the release.

Debuting at #3 in the US, the album coincided with a reunion tour, and certified Platinum. It is the last Van Halen album to feature contributions from Michael Anthony and Hagar.

Background
The compilation features 16 tracks taken from the six David Lee Roth era albums (1978–1984), and 14 from the four Sammy Hagar era albums (1986–1995), plus three live songs with Hagar from Live: Right Here, Right Now (1993), and three new songs with Hagar made for the compilation. The album was released in promotion of the new reunion tour featuring Hagar returning as lead singer. The three new songs were also performed live at various times.

Michael Anthony did not play bass guitar for the three new songs, although he did provide backing vocals for them. Anthony was not an official band member at that point and the songs were already recorded before he rejoined. The bass guitar on the new songs was played by Eddie Van Halen.

According to Anthony, the original plans involved one disc dedicated to Roth and another to Hagar which would feature the three new songs, but problems while negotiating with Roth led to the track listing on the released album.

Track listingNotesTrack 15 on disc one, "(Oh) Pretty Woman", is the single edit version (with the first snare drum hit removed) not the version that appeared on Diver Down as the album version segued directly from "Intruder", the track just before it on the album. 
Track 10 on disc two combines the instrumental "Strung Out" with "Not Enough", although it is shown on the album track list as simply "Not Enough". Both songs were listed as individual tracks on the Balance album.

PersonnelVan HalenSammy Hagar – lead vocals on tracks 2–4, 6, 8, 10, 12, 14, 16, 18 on disc 1; 2, 4, 6, 8, 10–12, on disc 2, rhythm guitar, backing vocals
Eddie Van Halen – lead guitar, rhythm guitar, acoustic guitar, keyboards, backing vocals, bass on tracks 2-4 on disc 1
Michael Anthony – bass, except on tracks 2–4 on disc 1, backing vocals
Alex Van Halen – drums, percussionAdditional musiciansDavid Lee Roth – lead and backing vocals on tracks 5, 7, 9, 11, 13, 15, 17, 19 on disc 1; 1, 3, 5, 7, 9, 13, 14 on disc 2
Steve Lukather – backing vocals on tracks 2–4, 14 on disc 1; 10 on disc 2Production'
Compilation producer: Van Halen
Engineer: Bill Malina (on new songs)
Product manager: Kenny Nemes
Project assistants: Hugh Brown, Tom Consolo, Malia Doss, Jimmy Edwards, Alan Fletcher, Kevin Gore, Bill Inglot, Joanne Jaworowski, Anna Loynes, Mark McKenna, David McLees, Scott Pascucci
Mastering supervisor: Glen Ballard
Remastering: Stephen Marcussen
Editorial supervision: Cory Frye
Art direction: Sara Cumings, Jeri Heiden
Design: Sara Cumings, Jeri Heiden
Photography: Kevin Westenberg
Liner notes: David Wild
Discographical annotation: Steve Woolard

Charts

Weekly charts

Year-end charts

Singles

Certification

References 

2004 greatest hits albums
Van Halen compilation albums
Warner Records compilation albums